Saint Lucia is known for beaches some of which are covered in black volcanic sand. The island's temperature averages 80 °F (27 °C) all year. The island offers many water adventures, everything from snorkelling to jet skiing  to parasailing.

Beaches

The following are some of the most popular and well known beaches in the island nation of Saint Lucia:

See also
 List of beaches

References

Beaches
 List
Saint Lucia
Saint Lucia